Bulldog Drummond Strikes Back is a 1947 American adventure crime mystery film directed by Frank McDonald and starring Ron Randell, Gloria Henry and Patrick O'Moore. The film is loosely based on the H. C. McNeile novel Knock-Out.

It was the second of Randell's performances as Drummond following Bulldog Drummond at Bay.

Cast
Ron Randell as Bulldog Drummond
Gloria Henry as Ellen Curtiss
Patrick O'Moore as Algy Longworth 
Anabel Shaw as Ellen Curtiss II
Terry Kilburn as Seymour
Holmes Herbert as Inspector McIver
Wilton Graff - Cedric Mason
Matthew Boulton - William Cosgrove
Barry Bernard - Vincent Cummings
Carl Harbord - Inspector Sanderson

Production
The Bulldog Drummond series had been popular B movies before the war. In June 1946 it was announced Venture Pictures, a Columbia producing unit headed by Lou Appleton and Bernard Small, had done a deal with the estate of H.C. McNeile to make two Bulldog Drummond pictures, starting with Bulldog Drummond at Bay, with an option to provide six more. In November 1946, it was announced that Drummond would be played by Ron Randell, an Australian actor who was signed to a long term contract with Columbia off the back of his performance in Smithy.RON RANDELL TO DO FILM FOR COLUMBIA: ONE-THIRD OF CAST
Special to THE NEW YORK TIMES. 23 Nov 1946: 22.

In February 1947 it was announced the second Drummond film was Bulldog Drummond Strikes Back''. The following month Frank MacDonald signed to direct and Gloria Henry was announced as Randell's co star.

Filming started May 1947.

References

Bibliography

External links

Films based on Bulldog Drummond
1947 films
1940s English-language films
1940s thriller films
Columbia Pictures films
American thriller films
American black-and-white films
Films with screenplays by Edward Anhalt
Films with screenplays by Edna Anhalt
British thriller films
Films directed by Frank McDonald
1940s American films
1940s British films